Zelleromyces is a genus of fungi in the family Russulaceae. It was first described by mycologists Rolf Singer and Alexander H. Smith in 1960 to contain hypogeous (underground) fungi with gasteroid fruit bodies that "bleed" latex when they are cut.

The genus was circumscribed in Mem. Torrey Bot. Club vol.21 (3) on page 18 in 1960.

The genus name of Zelleromyces is in honour of Sanford Myron Zeller (1885–1948), who was an American mycologist. 

Phylogenetic analyses show that Zelleromyces species fall into the genus Lactarius. Nevertheless, the genus name is still in use and has not been formally synonymised with Lactarius yet.

Species
As accepted by Species Fungorum;

Former species; (all are Russulaceae family)
 Z. australiensis sensu  = Zelleromyces glabrellus
 Z. claridgei  = Arcangeliella claridgei
 Z. corkii  = Arcangeliella corkii
 Z. daucinus  = Arcangeliella daucina
 Z. dendriticus  = Lactifluus dendriticus
 Z. gardneri  = Lactarius gardneri
 Z. giennensis  = Lactarius giennensis
 Z. hispanicus  = Lactarius aurantiacus
 Z. josserandii  = Lactarius josserandii
 Z. major  = Arcangeliella major
 Z. meridionalis  = Russula meridionalis
 Z. meridionalis  = Russula meridionalis
 Z. soehneri  = Lactarius soehneri
 Z. stephensii  = Lactarius stephensii

References

External links

Russulales
Russulales genera
Taxa named by Rolf Singer